The Bhojpuri people or Bhojpuriyas are a group from the Indian subcontinent who speak the Bhojpuri-language and inhabit the Bhojpuri-Purvanchal region. This area is now divided between the western part of the Indian state of Bihar, the eastern part of the Indian state of Uttar Pradesh, northwestern Jharkhand, along with some neighbouring districts in the Madhya Pradesh and Madhesh of Nepal. A significant diaspora population of Bhojpuris can be found in Trinidad and Tobago, Netherlands, Guyana,Jamaica, Suriname, other parts of the Caribbean,  Fiji, South Africa, and Mauritius.

Culture

Language and literature

Bhojpuri is spoken by around 50 million people. It is native to Bhojpuri region of Bihar and Uttar Pradesh. Bhojpuri is sociolinguistically considered one of the "Hindi dialects" although it linguistically belongs to the geographic Bihari branch of Eastern Indo-Aryan languages. The first Bhojpuri novel Bindiã was written by Ram Nath Pandey in 1955. It was published by Bhojpuri Sansad, Jagatganj, Varanasi. Bhikhari Thakur's  was famous writer of Bhojpuri language. His famous book is Bidesiya.

Cuisine

Bhojpuri cuisine is part of North Indian cuisine. It is mild and spice is less used. It has majorly influenced the cuisine of the Caribbean, Fiji, Mauritius, and South Africa.

Influence and reputation
According to G.A. Grierson, Bhojpuriya people have influenced all over India and called them people from energetic race and has called them the Civilizer of Hindostan. In order to compare Bhojpuriyas with Maithils and Magahiya he writes:

He further writes that Bhojpuri people form the fighting nation of Hindostan, and has praised for grab any opportunity. He writes:

Notable people

Mangal Pandey, Freedom Fighter from Ballia
Ravindra Kishore Sinha, Billionaire businessman and Politician
Siddhant Chaturvedi, Bollywood actor
Jayaprakash Narayan, Indian independence activist  and politician (Bharat Ratna)
Dr. Rajendra Prasad, First President of India
Lal Bahadur Shastri, Second Prime Minister of India
Chandra Shekhar, Former Prime Minister of India
Lalu Prasad Yadav, Politician and Former Chief Minister of Bihar
Bhikhari Thakur, Author
Heera Dom, Poet
Raj Mohan, Singer
Dinesh Bhramar, Poet
Bindeshwari Dubey, freedom fighter and politician
Ravi Kishan, Actor and Politician   
Manoj Bajpayee, Actor
Vinay Pathak, Actor
Om Prakash Rajbhar, Politician
Saryu Rai, Politician
Medini Ray, king of Palamu in 17th century
Babu Veer Kunwar Singh, Maharaja of Jagdishpur estate
Parichay Das
Manoj Bhawuk, Bhojpuri Poet
Anjana Om Kashyap, Journalist
Chandan Tiwari, Folk singer
Manoj Tiwari, Actor, singer and politician
Pankaj Tripathi, Actor
Tejashwi Yadav, Politician

See also 
 Indo-Caribbeans
 Indo-Fijians
 Mauritians of Indian origin
Bihari Mauritians
Indian South Africans

References

Indo-Aryan peoples
Ethnic groups in India
Ethnic groups divided by international borders
Ethnic groups in Nepal